Valeria Peter Predescu (1947 – April 28, 2009) was a Romanian popular singer. She was born in Telciu, Bistrița-Năsăud County. She died at 62 in Bistrița, having suffered a heart attack.

External links
Biography

References

1947 births
2009 deaths
People from Bistrița-Năsăud County
20th-century Romanian women singers
20th-century Romanian singers